The Sultana is a lost 1916 silent film
crime drama directed by Sherwood MacDonald and starring Ruth Roland. It was produced by Balboa Amusement Producing Company and distributed by Pathé Exchange.

Cast
Ruth Roland as Virginia Lowndes
William Conklin as Dr. Thomas Mills
Charles Dudley as Peter Fulton
Frank Erlanger as Durand
Daniel Gilfether as Willoughby Kirkland
Edward Peters as Gregory Kirkland (credited as E.T. Peters)
Ed Brady as Count Strelitso (credited as Edwin J. Brady)
Gordon Sackville as Captain Rimbert
R. Henry Grey as Robert Sautrelle
Richard Johnson

References

External links

1916 films
American silent feature films
Lost American films
Films based on American novels
American black-and-white films
American crime drama films
1916 crime drama films
Lost crime drama films
Pathé Exchange films
1916 lost films
1910s American films
Silent American drama films